The Battle of Fontaine-Française occurred on 5 June 1595 between the French royal forces of King Henry IV of France and troops of Spain and the Catholic League commanded by Juan Fernández de Velasco and Charles of Lorraine, Duke of Mayenne, during the eighth and final war (1585-1598) of the French Wars of Religion.

Background
In early June 1595, Don Juan Fernández de Velasco (governor of Milan and Constable of Castile) crossed the Alps with an army of 12,000 men from Italy and Sicily.  In the Bishopric of Besançon he was joined by Charles of Mayenne (chief of the Catholic League).  Together they moved on Dijon in order to take the city.  Warned of their movements, Henry IV raced to Troyes with 3,000 men that he was able to gather.

The battle
The battle took place on 5 June at Fontaine-Française (Burgundy).  That morning, Henry IV accompanied his scouts. They encountered the Spanish troops by accident, and – as at the Battle of Eu the year before – Henry attacked them with light horse.  Against all odds, he surprised them and forced them to retreat temporarily.

After this charge, Henry decided to recruit local inhabitants (largely peasants) and to arm them with scythes and any metal object that might shine in the sunlight.  He regrouped them on a hill with military troops, thus attempting to ruse the opposing force into believing he had a larger army. 

Meanwhile, Fernández de Velasco was convinced that Henry was waiting for reinforcements, and observing the troop movements from afar, came to believe that Henry's forces had superior numbers.  He decided to retreat.

Aftermath
The French royal victory marked an end to the Catholic League, although the Wars of Religion would not come to a complete end until the signing of the Peace of Vervins on 2 May 1598, under which the Spanish ceded their remaining captured French towns.

Notes and references
This article is based in part on a translation of the article Bataille de Fontaine-Française from the French Wikipedia on 14 March 2007.
 Jouanna, Arlette and Jacqueline Boucher, Dominique Biloghi, Guy Thiec.  Histoire et dictionnaire des Guerres de religion.  Collection: Bouquins.  Paris: Laffont, 1998. 

Fontaine-Francaise
Fontaine-Francaise
Fontaine-Francaise
Fontaine-Francaise
1595 in France
Conflicts in 1595
History of Côte-d'Or